The Harvard Company-Weber Dental Manufacturing Company, also known as Factory Industrial Supply, was a company in Ohio, USA. Its main building, of the same name as the company, was built in 1896. The building was designed by Guy Tilden on a commission from Frank E. Case, who also hired Tilden to design the Case Mansion.

The building was listed on the National Register of Historic Places in 1987.

References

External links 
 Weber Dental Manufacturing Company at Abandoned

National Register of Historic Places in Stark County, Ohio
Romanesque Revival architecture in Ohio
Industrial buildings completed in 1896
Buildings and structures in Canton, Ohio